Karine Boivin Roy is a Canadian politician, who was elected to the National Assembly of Quebec in the 2022 Quebec general election. She represents the electoral district of Anjou–Louis-Riel as a member of the Coalition Avenir Québec.

She previously served on Montreal City Council as representative for Louis-Riel ward in the borough of Mercier–Hochelaga-Maisonneuve from 2013 to 2021. A member of the Ensemble Montréal political party, she was first elected in the 2013 municipal election.

References

Living people
People from Mercier–Hochelaga-Maisonneuve
Montreal city councillors
Women MNAs in Quebec
Coalition Avenir Québec MNAs
21st-century Canadian politicians
21st-century Canadian women politicians
Women municipal councillors in Canada
Year of birth missing (living people)